is a railway station in Mooka, Tochigi Prefecture, Japan, operated by the Mooka Railway.

Lines
Mooka Station is a station on the Mooka Line, and is located 16.4 rail kilometers from the terminus of the line at Shimodate Station.

Station layout
Mooka Station has one island platform and one side platform serving three tracks in total.

History
Mooka Station opened on 1 April 1912 as a station on the Japanese Government Railway, which subsequently became the Japanese National Railways (JNR). The station was absorbed into the JR East network upon the privatization of the JNR on 1 April 1987, and the Mooka Railway from 11 April 1988. The current station building was completed in 1997 and resembles a steam locomotive in appearance.

Surrounding area
Japan National Route 294
Mooka City Hall
Mooka Post Office

References

External links

 Mooka Railway Station information 

Railway stations in Tochigi Prefecture
Railway stations in Japan opened in 1912
Mooka, Tochigi